The Patent Act of 1922 began circulating general information about how to acquire a patent to the general public as a means of spurring private invention initiatives.  

The law also enlarged the jurisdiction of the Court of Customs and Patent Appeals to include appeals on questions of law from Tariff Commission findings in proceedings relating to unfair practices in the import trade.  The Commissioner of Patents was given the power to require patent agents and patent attorneys to have certain qualifications before being allowed to practice before the Patent Office.  He was also authorized to suspend or disbar such persons for cause.  The salaries of the Commissioner and other officers of the Patent Office were increased, and 49 more positions were created on the technical staff.  The fee for filing a patent application was increased from $15 to $20.  The office of Patent Solicitor was created by the act.

1922 in law
United States federal patent legislation